G & G vs. Wikimedia Foundation, Inc. [2009] EWHC 3148 (QB) was an English legal case. The case involved "G" who sought a Norwich Pharmacal order requiring that the respondent disclose the IP address of an individual who had edited Wikipedia to include private and sensitive information about her and her child. The order was granted. The judgment drew attention, inter alia, in paragraph 12 to the risk that "the naming of the respondent may indirectly enable readers who already know other information about the case to identify of [sic] the claimant."   The possibility is alluded to again in paragraph 40, which notes that "There are occasions when the court does impose a prohibition upon disclosure of the fact that an order has been made."

References

External links
Judgment on BAILII

Wikipedia controversies
2009 in British law
Wikimedia Foundation litigation